The 2009–10 season of the FA Women's Premier League was the 18th season of the top-flight of English women's association football. After the season the FA WSL was created above the Premier League. Teams could apply for a license and six of the top teams were accepted.

National Division

Top scorers

Northern Division

Southern Division

References
Soccerway table
full-time.thefa

Eng
Wo
FA Women's National League seasons
1